There have been five Baronetcies created for people with the surname Forbes, four in the Baronetage of Nova Scotia and one in the Baronetage of the United Kingdom. The first holder of the Burn Baronetcy of Jessfield, created in the Baronetage of the United Kingdom in 1923, assumed the surname of Forbes-Leith of Fyvie in 1925.

Forbes, later Stuart-Forbes, of Monymusk (1626)
The Forbes Baronetcy, of Pitsligo and Monymusk in the County of Aberdeen, was created in the Baronetage of Nova Scotia on 30 March 1626 for William Forbes, with remainder to heirs male whatsoever. He was a descendant of Duncan Forbes, second son of James Forbes, 2nd Lord Forbes (see the Lord Forbes). The eighth Baronet assumed the additional surname and arms of Hepburn. He was the heir general of the last Lord Forbes of Pitsligo (his ancestor, the fourth Baronet, having married Hon. Mary, daughter of Alexander Forbes, 3rd Lord Forbes of Pitsligo). His only child, Harriet Williamina, married Charles Henry Rolle Trefusis, 20th Baron Clinton. On the Baronet's death in 1828 the Forbes of Pitsligo estates passed to his daughter and son-in-law (see the Baron Clinton). The seventh Baronet married Williamina Wishart, only child and heiress of Sir John Belshes Wishart (later Stuart), 4th Baronet. The tenth Baronet assumed the additional surname of Stuart.

Baronets
Sir William Forbes, 1st Baronet (died )
Sir William Forbes, 2nd Baronet (died c. 1680)
Sir John Forbes, 3rd Baronet (died c. 1700)
Sir William Forbes, 4th Baronet (died c. 1720)
Sir William Forbes, 5th Baronet (died 1743)
Sir William Forbes, 6th Baronet (1739–1806)
Sir William Forbes, 7th Baronet (1773–1828)
Sir John Stuart Hepburn Forbes, 8th Baronet (1804–1866)
Sir William Forbes, 9th Baronet (1835–1906)
Sir Charles Hay Hepburn Stuart-Forbes, 10th Baronet (1871–1927)
Sir Hugh Stuart-Forbes, 11th Baronet (1896–1937)
Sir Charles Edward Stuart-Forbes, 12th Baronet (1903–1985)
Sir William Daniel Stuart-Forbes, 13th Baronet (born 1935).

The heir apparent is the present holder's son Kenneth Charles Stuart-Forbes, Younger of Pitsligo (born 1956).
The heir apparent's heir apparent is his only son Samuel Alexander Murray Stuart-Forbes (born 1989).

Forbes, of Castle Forbes (1628)
The Forbes Baronetcy, of Castle Forbes in the County of Longford, was created in the Baronetage of Nova Scotia on 29 September 1628 for Sir Arthur Forbes, 1st Baronet. He was the great-great-grandson of the Hon. Patrick Forbes, third son of the aforementioned James Forbes, 2nd Lord Forbes. His son, the second Baronet, was elevated to the Peerage of Ireland as Earl of Granard in 1684.

Baronets
See the Earl of Granard

Forbes, of Craigievar (1630)

The Forbes Baronetcy, of Craigievar in the County of Aberdeen, was created in the Baronetage of Nova Scotia on 20 April 1630 for William Forbes. He was also a descendant of Hon. Patrick Forbes, third son of the second Lord Forbes, and the nephew of the first Baronet of the 1628 creation. The fourth Baronet represented Aberdeenshire in the House of Commons. The fifth Baronet married the Hon. Sarah Sempill, eldest daughter of Hugh Sempill, 12th Lord Sempill. Their grandson, the eighth Baronet, succeeded as seventeenth Lord Sempill in 1884 (see Lord Sempill for earlier history of this title). The titles remained united until the death of his grandson, the nineteenth Lord and tenth Baronet, in 1965.

At that time great controversy arose. As the 10th Baronet only had female issue, the barony and the baronetcy had to be separated. He was succeeded in the lordship by his daughter (see Lord Sempill for later history of this title) but the baronetcy had to pass to a male successor. His youngest sibling, a trans man, had changed his legal gender from female to male by petitioning the Sheriff of Aberdeen in 1952, becoming Ewan Forbes-Sempill, and assumed the right of succession. A male cousin challenged Ewan's right to the title, but after a two-year legal dispute the title was succeeded by Ewan as Sir Ewan Forbes, 11th Baronet (the Sempill surname was dropped on his request). On his death in 1991 the title was then inherited by the same person who had challenged the legality of the succession, his cousin Sir John Alexander Cumnock Forbes, 12th Baronet.

On the death of Sir John A. C. Forbes in 2000, the baronetcy was inherited by a kinsman, Andrew Iain Ochoncar Forbes (1945), the only son of Lieutenant Colonel Patrick Walter Forbes OBE, elder son of Lieutenant Colonel James Ochoncar Forbes, younger son of James Ochoncar Forbes, younger brother of the 8th baronet and 17th Lord Semphill. However, the baronetcy is on the dormant list of the Standing Council of the Baronetage, as the 13th baronet has not yet established his claim to the title. In 1984 the 13th baronet married Jane Elizabeth Dunbar-Nasmith, a daughter of Rear-Admiral David Dunbar-Nasmith, and they had two sons, James and David Forbes, and two daughters, Isabel and Anna Elizabeth Abercrombie Forbes.

Baronets
Sir William Forbes, 1st Baronet (died 1648)
John Forbes, 2nd Baronet (1636–1703)
William Forbes, 3rd Baronet (1660 – c. 1730)
Sir Arthur Forbes, 4th Baronet (1709–1773)
Sir William Forbes, 5th Baronet (1755–1816)
Sir Arthur Forbes, 6th Baronet (1784–1823)
Sir John Forbes, 7th Baronet (1785–1846)
William Forbes, 17th Lord Sempill, 8th Baronet (1836–1905) (succeeded as 17th Lord Sempill in 1884)
John Forbes-Sempill, 18th Lord Sempill, 9th Baronet (1863–1934)
William Francis Forbes-Sempill, 19th Lord Sempill, 10th Baronet (1893–1965)
Sir Ewan Forbes, 11th Baronet (1912–1991)
Sir John Alexander Cumnock Forbes, 12th Baronet (1927–2000)
Sir Andrew Iain Ochoncar Forbes, 13th Baronet (1945–)
Sir James Patrick Ochoncar Forbes, 14th Baronet (born 1986)

Forbes, of Foveran (1700)

The Forbes Baronetcy, of Foveran, was created in the Baronetage of Nova Scotia on 10 April 1700 for Samuel Forbes. The title became dormant on the death of the third Baronet in circa 1760.

Baronets
Sir Samuel Forbes, 1st Baronet (c. 1663 – 1717)
Sir Alexander Forbes, 2nd Baronet (died c. 1750)
Sir John Forbes, 3rd Baronet (died c. 1760)

Forbes, of Newe (1823)

The Forbes Baronetcy, of Newe in the County of Aberdeen, was created in the Baronetage of the United Kingdom on 4 November 1823 for Charles Forbes, a merchant in Bombay, India. In 1833 he became the heir male of Alexander Forbes, 3rd Lord Forbes of Pitsligo (a title which had been attainted in 1745), and was allowed by the Lord Lyon to use the Pitsligo arms and supporters. Forbes was a descendant of William Forbes, younger brother of Sir Alexander Forbes of Pitsligo (from whom the Lords Forbes of Pitsligo descended) and great-grandson of Sir William Forbes, brother of Alexander Forbes, 1st Lord Forbes.

Baronets
Sir Charles Forbes, 1st Baronet (1774–1849)
Sir Charles Forbes, 2nd Baronet (1832–1852)
Sir Charles Forbes, 3rd Baronet (1803–1877)
Sir Charles John Forbes, 4th Baronet (1843–1884)
Sir Charles Stewart Forbes, 5th Baronet (1867–1927)
Sir John Stewart Forbes, 6th Baronet (1901–1984)
Sir Hamish Stewart Forbes, MBE, MC, KStJ, 7th Baronet (1916–2007)
Sir James Thomas Stewart Forbes, 8th Baronet (born 1957)

Burn, later Forbes-Leith of Fyvie, of Jessfield (1923)
The Forbes-Leith of Fyvie Baronetcy, of Jessfield in the County of Midlothian, originally the Burn Baronetcy, was created in the Baronetage of the United Kingdom on 7 March 1923 for the soldier and Conservative politician Charles Rosdew Burn. He had previously represented Torquay in the House of Commons. Burn was the youngest son of General Robert Burn and the husband of Hon. Ethel, only daughter and heiress of Alexander John Forbes-Leith, 1st Baron Leith of Fyvie. By edict of the Lord Lyon in 1925 Burn assumed the surname and arms of Forbes-Leith of Fyvie, for himself, his wife and son, according to the terms of his father-in-law's will. Lord Leith of Fyvie was the eldest son of Rear-Admiral John James Leith by his wife Margaret, daughter and heir of Alexander Forbes, a descendant of Duncan Forbes, second son of the second Lord Forbes. The first Baronet's younger son, the second Baronet, served as Lord Lieutenant of Aberdeenshire from 1959 to 1973.

Baronets
Sir Charles Rosdew Forbes-Leith, 1st Baronet (1859–1930)
Sir (Robert) Iain (Algernon) Forbes-Leith, 2nd Baronet (1902–1973)
Sir Andrew George Forbes-Leith, 3rd Baronet (1929–2000)
Sir George Ian David Forbes-Leith, 4th Baronet (born 1967)

The heir apparent is the present holder's son Alexander Philip George Forbes-Leith (born 1999).

See also
Lord Forbes
Lord Forbes of Pitsligo
Earl of Granard
Clan Forbes
Baron Leith of Fyvie

Notes

References
Kidd, Charles, Williamson, David (editors). Debrett's Peerage and Baronetage (1990 edition). New York: St Martin's Press, 1990, 

Baronetcies in the Baronetage of Nova Scotia
Baronetcies in the Baronetage of the United Kingdom
Dormant baronetcies in the Baronetage of Nova Scotia
1626 establishments in Nova Scotia
1923 establishments in the United Kingdom